The 1795 United States Senate election in Pennsylvania was held on February 26, 1795. William Bingham was elected by the Pennsylvania General Assembly to the United States Senate.

Results
Incumbent Federalist Robert Morris, who was elected in 1788, was not a candidate for re-election to another term. The Pennsylvania General Assembly, consisting of the House of Representatives and the Senate, convened on February 26, 1795, to elect a new Senator to fill the term beginning on March 4, 1795. The results of the vote of both houses combined are as follows:

See also 
 United States Senate elections, 1794 and 1795

References

External links
Pennsylvania Election Statistics: 1682-2006 from the Wilkes University Election Statistics Project

1795
Pennsylvania
United States Senate